
Gmina Wilga is a rural gmina (administrative district) in Garwolin County, Masovian Voivodeship, in east-central Poland. Its seat is the village of Wilga, which lies approximately 17 kilometres (10 mi) south-west of Garwolin and 49 km (30 mi) south-east of Warsaw.

Villages
Gmina Wilga contains the villages and settlements of Celejów, Cyganówka, Goźlin Górny, Goźlin Mały, Holendry, Malinówka, Mariańskie Porzecze, Nieciecz, Nowe Podole, Nowy Żabieniec, Ostrybór, Ruda Tarnowska, Skurcza, Stare Podole, Stary Żabieniec, Tarnów, Trzcianka, Uścieniec-Kolonia, Wicie, Wilga, Wólka Gruszczyńska and Zakrzew.

Neighbouring gminas
Gmina Wilga is bordered by the gminas of Garwolin, Łaskarzew, Maciejowice, Magnuszew, Sobienie-Jeziory and Warka.

References
Polish official population figures 2006

Wilga
Garwolin County